We Came to Play! is an album by Tower of Power released in 1978.  It marked the debut of singer Michael Jeffries, who would stay with T.O.P. through the mid-1980s.  Steve Cropper (of Booker T. & the M.G.'s fame) produced this album.  This album features Victor Conte, the future founder of the controversial BALCO, on bass, and who is also the cousin of band guitarist Bruce Conte.  Drummer Ron Beck takes a lead vocal spot on "Love Bug", which features founding T.O.P. drummer David Garibaldi on second drums.  Garibaldi would return to the band on the next album, but neither Conte, Bruce or Victor, would after this album.

Track listing
 "We Came To Play"  (Emilio Castillo, Stephen "Doc" Kupka) - 3:38
 "Lovin' You Is Gonna See Me Thru" (Clifford Coulter) - 6:04
 "Let Me Touch You" (Victor Conte, Chester Thompson, S. Beck, Ron E. Beck, Edward McGee) - 4:33
 "Yin-Yang Thang" (Emilio Castillo, Stephen "Doc" Kupka) - 4:23
 "Share My Life" (Bruce Conte, Hubert Tubbs, Coleman Head) - 3:56
 "Bittersweet Soul Music" (Rob Moitoza) - 3:28
 "Am I a Fool" (Hubert Tubbs, Emilio Castillo, Stephen "Doc" Kupka) - 3:58
 "Love Bug" (Ron E. Beck, Steve Cropper, Victor Conte, Chester Thompson) - 4:01
 "Somewhere Down The Road" (Bruce Conte, Coleman Head) - 4:39

Personnel 
Tower of Power
 Michael Jeffries – lead vocals (1-7, 9)
 Chester Thompson – acoustic piano, Yamaha electric grand piano, Fender Rhodes, clavinet, ARP String Ensemble, Minimoog, Polymoog, organ, backing vocals
 Bruce Conte – guitars, backing vocals
 Victor Conte – bass
 Ronnie Beck – drums, backing vocals, lead vocals (8)
 Lenny Pickett – alto saxophone, first tenor saxophone, Lyricon, clarinet, contrabass clarinet, alto flute, bass flute, E-mu synthesizer, synth solo (9)
 Stephen "Doc" Kupka – baritone saxophone
 Emilio Castillo – second tenor saxophone, backing vocals
 Mic Gillette – trombone, bass trombone, trumpet, flugelhorn, backing vocals 
 Greg Adams – trumpet, flugelhorn

Additional musicians
 Steve Cropper – additional guitars (2, 3, 6, 8, 9)
 David Garibaldi – additional drums (8)
 Gerald Vinci – concertmaster 
 Clifford Coulter – backing vocals (2)
 Carol Rogers – backing vocals (5)
 Brooks Hunnicutt – backing vocals (6)
 Lisa Roberts – backing vocals (6)
 Karen Wright – backing vocals (6)
 Jim McCandless – bass backing vocals (8)

Production 
 Steve Cropper – producer 
 Alan Chinowsky – engineer, mixing 
 Frank "Cheech" D'Amico – assistant engineer 
 Steve Fontano – assistant engineer 
 Alex Kashevaroff – assistant engineer 
 Rick Sanchez – assistant engineer
 Vic Anesini – remastering at Sony Music Studios (New York City, New York)
 Tower of Power – art direction 
 Bruce Steinberg – design, photography 

1978 albums
Tower of Power albums
Albums produced by Steve Cropper
Columbia Records albums